There have been four baronetcies created for members of the Welsh Philipps family, one in the Baronetage of England and three in the Baronetage of the United Kingdom (see also Philips baronets).

The Philipps Baronetcy, of Picton Castle in the County of Pembroke, was created in the Baronetage of England on 9 November 1621. For more information on this creation, see Viscount St Davids and Baron Milford.

The Philipps Baronetcy, of Picton Castle in the County of Pembroke, was created in the Baronetage of the United Kingdom on 13 February 1828 for Richard Philipps. Born Richard Bulkeley Philipps Grant, he was the son of John Grant and Mary Philippa Artemisia, daughter of James Child and Mary Philippa Artemisia, daughter of Bulkeley Philipps, uncle of the seventh Baronet of the first creation (who had been created Baron Milford in 1776). In 1847 he was elevated to the peerage as Baron Milford. For more information on this creation, see Baron Milford (1847 creation).

The Philipps Baronetcy, of Picton in the County of Pembroke, was created in the Baronetage of the United Kingdom on 23 July 1887 for Charles Edward Gregg Philipps, Lord-Lieutenant of Haverfordwest from 1876 to 1925. Born Charles Edward Gregg, he was the husband of Mary Philippa, daughter of James Henry Alexander Philipps (originally Gwyther), half-brother and heir of the first Baronet of the second creation. The title became extinct on the death of the fourth Baronet in 1962.

The Philipps Baronetcy, of Llanstephan in the County of Radnor, was created in the Baronetage of the United Kingdom on 22 September 1919. He was the sixth son of the twelfth Baronet of the first creation. For more information on this creation, see the Baron Milford (1939 creation).

Philipps baronets, of Picton Castle (1621)
see the Viscount St Davids

Philipps baronets, of Picton Castle (1828)
see the Baron Milford (1847 creation)

Philipps baronets, of Picton (1887)
Sir Charles Edward Gregg Philipps, 1st Baronet (1840–1928)
Sir Henry Erasmus Edward Philipps, 2nd Baronet (1871–1938)
Sir John Erasmus Gwynne Alexander Philipps, 3rd Baronet (1915–1948)
Sir Richard Foley Foley-Philipps, 4th Baronet (1920–1962)

Philipps baronets, of Llanstephan (1919)
see the Baron Milford (1939 creation)

See also
Picton Castle

Notes

References
Kidd, Charles, Williamson, David (editors). Debrett's Peerage and Baronetage (1990 edition). New York: St Martin's Press, 1990,

External links
History of the Philipps family

Baronetcies in the Baronetage of England
Baronetcies in the Baronetage of the United Kingdom
Extinct baronetcies in the Baronetage of the United Kingdom
1621 establishments in England